Edisto Inlet is a rectangular arm of Moubray Bay,  long and  wide, entered between Cape Hallett and Cape Christie. The  (Commander Roger W. Luther) was the first ship to enter this branch of Moubray Bay in February 1956, and the name "Edisto Bay" was given at that time, but "Edisto Inlet" has overtaken the earlier name in usage.

References 

Inlets of Antarctica
Landforms of Victoria Land
Borchgrevink Coast